The 1997 LPGA Championship was the 43rd LPGA Championship, played May 15–18 at DuPont Country Club in Wilmington, Delaware.

Christa Johnson won her only major title in a sudden-death playoff over Leta Lindley. The win came with a par on the second extra hole, after both had players bogeyed the first. Johnson and Lindley were co-leaders after 54 holes. It was the first playoff at the LPGA Championship since 1970, then a full 18-hole round on Monday.

This was the fourth of eleven consecutive LPGA Championships at DuPont Country Club.

Past champions in the field

Made the cut

Source:

Missed the cut

Source:

Beth Daniel (1990) did not play

Final leaderboard
Sunday, May 18, 1997

Source:

Playoff

Sudden-death playoff held on holes 18 and 10.

Scorecard

{|class="wikitable" span = 50 style="font-size:85%;
|-
|style="background: PaleGreen;" width=10|
|Bogey
|}
Source:

References

External links
Golf Observer leaderboard

Women's PGA Championship
Golf in Delaware
LPGA Championship
LPGA Championship
LPGA Championship
LPGA Championship
Women's sports in Delaware